Austrographa is a genus of lichen-forming fungi in the family Roccellaceae. It has three species. The genus was circumscribed in 2013 by lichenologists Laurens Sparrius, John Elix, and Alan Archer, with Austrographa kurriminensis assigned as the type species. The genus had been published invalidly on two separate occasions. All three species in the genus were found in a mangrove stand in Queensland, Australia.

Species
 Austrographa kurriminensis 
 Austrographa pseudopallidella 
 Austrographa skyrinica

References

Roccellaceae
Lichen genera
Taxa described in 2013
Taxa named by John Alan Elix
Taxa named by Alan W. Archer